Zaldapa (Zeldepa) was a large Late Roman fortified city in Scythia Minor/Moesia, located near today's Abrit, Bulgaria.

It was originally an ancient Thracian settlement from around the 8th century BC. The site of over 35 hectares was protected from the East, North and Northwest by a deep valley.

Excavations have revealed the defensive walls, a Roman civic basilica, an early Christian basilica with two crypts and a huge water reservoir. The walls had 32 bastions of various shapes and 3 main and 2 secondary gates. The double north gate was designed to enclose and trap attackers.

Zaldapa is included in the list of fortifications renovated during the reign of Emperor Justinian I the Great (527–565). It was also mentioned as the seat of a bishop.

In 2015, a Greek stone inscription has been discovered by the archaeologists excavating the ruins of a Christian bishop's basilica in the fortress of Zaldapa.

References

Further reading 

 Dominic Moreau, Nicolas Beaudry & Georgi Atanasov, with the collaboration of Ioto Valeriev, Albena Milanova, Brahim M'Barek, Elio Hobdari & Irina Achim, "The Archaeology of the Late Roman City of Zaldapa: The Status Quaestionis in 2016 (with an Appendix on Seasons 2017–2019)", in Dominic Moreau, Carolyn S. Snively, Alessandra Guiglia, Isabella Baldini, Ljubomir Milanović, Ivana Popović, Nicolas Beaudry & Orsolya Heinrich-Tamáska (eds), Archaeology of a World of Changes: Late Roman and Early Byzantine Architecture, Sculpture and Landscapes. Selected Papers from the 23rd International Congress of Byzantine Studies (Belgrade, 22–27 August 2016) – In memoriam Claudiae Barsanti, BAR Publishing, Oxford (BAR International Series, 2973), 2020, pp. 35-55.

External links 
 The Zaldapa Fortress near the village of Abrit

Byzantine forts
Roman towns and cities in Bulgaria
Tourist attractions in Dobrich Province
Roman fortifications in Moesia Inferior